Leonid Rudin is an American computer scientist known as the co-founder and CEO of Cognitech. He is  one of the leaders in the Forensic Video Image processing field.

Education 
Rudin holds an MSci. and PhD., degrees in Computer Science and Computational Imaging Science from California Institute of Technology (Caltech).

Career 
Rudin has worked in the computer software industry for decades. He pioneered Total Variation Minimization approach in Image Processing and Analysis.
 
Rudin is the first author of a highly cited original paper in image processing. He is the co-founder of Forensic Video Processing and 360 Forensic Photogrammetry fields. Between 1989 and 2008, he served as "Principal R&D Investigator" for Defense Advanced Project Agency (DARPA). In 1992, he co-authored and co-designed the  first commercial Forensic Video software  known as  "Video Investigator".

In 1988, Rudin co-founded Cognitech, a company that develops forensic video enhancement software & hardware. Between 2000 and 2008, he served as "Prncipal R&D Investigator" for National Geospatial-Intelligence Agency (NGA).
 
Rudin has several USPTO Patents. He is a member of professional associations such Institute of Electrical and Electronics Engineers (IEEE), American Academy of Forensic Science (AAFS), and  American Society for Photogrammetry and Remote Sensing (ASPRS).

Awards and honors 
Rudin is the winner of  2010 American Technology Award for PiX2GPS and the winner of DePrima Mathematics Applications Award.

See also 
 Stanley Osher
 Total variation denoising

References 

Living people
American chief executives
American company founders
American computer scientists
Year of birth missing (living people)